Nara Shumsher Jang Bahadur Rana, was the second police chief of Nepal Police after its establishment in the year 2007 B.S. (1951 C.E.). He remained chief for a tenure of two years before being succeeded by Gyan Bahadur Yakthumba as the police chief.

Nara Shumsher J.B.R. was honored by the government of Nepal as the Father of Nepali Sports for his contribution, both as a player and an official, to Nepali sports. He was the first Nepali player to get 'Merit Award' from the Olympic Council of Asia.

Praised in the sporting fraternity Rana, however, is despised by the common people for his involvement in the killing of four martyrs Shukraraj Shastri, Dharma Bhakta Mathema, Dashrath Chand and Gangalal Shrestha. He supervised the killing of the four martyrs and is believed to have shot Gangalal and Dashrath Chand himself, after the executioner deputed to shoot hesitated.

Notable published works 
 “Janarala Nara Samsera Janga Bahadura Ranako Jivani: Uhamkai Juvani” (2006).

Honours

National Honours 
 Member of the Order of the Star of Nepal, 1st class.
 Member of the Order of Om Rama Patta.
 Member of the Order of the Three Divine Powers, 1st class.
 Member of the Order of Gurkha Right Hand, 1st class.
 Member of the Order of the Footprint of Nepal, 2nd class (23 October 2001).

Foreign Honours 
 Honorary Knight Commander of the Royal Victorian Order [KCVO] (United Kingdom, 26 February 1961). 
 Merit Award of the Olympic Council of Asia.

References

Nepalese police officers
Chiefs of police
Inspectors General of Police (Nepal)
Recipients of the Order of the Star of Nepal
Members of the Order of Tri Shakti Patta, First Class
Members of the Order of Gorkha Dakshina Bahu, First Class
Honorary Knights Commander of the Royal Victorian Order
1911 births
2006 deaths
Rana dynasty
20th-century Nepalese nobility
21st-century Nepalese nobility
People from Lalitpur District, Nepal